Non Khun is a district (amphoe) in the eastern part of Sisaket province, northeastern Thailand.

Geography
Neighboring districts are (from the south clockwise): Benchalak, Nam Kliang, and Kanthararom of Sisaket Province, and Samrong of Ubon Ratchathani province.

History
Non Khun was created as a minor district (king amphoe) under Kanthararom district on 1 September 1977, with the tambons, Non Kho, Pho, Bok, and Nong Kung. It was upgraded to a full district on 1 January 1988.

Administration
The district is divided into five sub-districts (tambons), which are further subdivided into 80 villages (mubans). There are no municipal (thesaban) areas. There are five tambon administrative organizations (TAO).

References

External links
amphoe.com

Non Khun